Rory Paul McKeown (born 8 April 1993) is a Northern Irish footballer, also often referred to by his nickname "Justy McKnight", who plays as a left-back who plays for Crusaders in the NIFL Premiership.

A versatile left-sided player, he has represented Northern Ireland at under-16, under-17, under-18, under-19 and  under-21 level.

A former youth-team player at Ipswich Town, he turned professional at Kilmarnock and scored on his Scottish Premier League debut in July 2011. He spent three years at the club, and spent the latter half of the 2013–14 season on loan at Cowdenbeath. He joined Raith Rovers in June 2014, and went on to miss just one match for the club over the course of the next two seasons. He joined Accrington Stanley on non-contract terms in August 2016, and signed with Southport four months later after a brief spell with Warrington Town. He spent the 2017–18 season with Warrington Town.

Career

Kilmarnock
McKeown started his career as a youth-team player for Ipswich Town. McKeown went on to develop in the Ipswich under-18s and reserve teams before he was released in June 2011 after "Blues" manager Paul Jewell opted not to give him a professional contract upon the expiry of his academy scholarship.

McKeown joined Kilmarnock after a short trial in July 2011, having been signed ahead of fellow trialist Mitchell Piqué. Manager Kenny Shiels said that "Rory played for me at 13 as an outside left in my Excellence Programme back in Northern Ireland. I've always seen the potential in him and he's one we can develop into a good left-back". McKeown scored on his competitive debut for "Killie" with "a stunning 25-yard strike" in a 1–1 draw with Dundee United at Tannadice Park on 24 July. However he struggled for first-team action after Jeroen Tesselaar was instead favoured at left-back. He made 21 appearances throughout the 2011–12 season and 18 appearances in the 2012–13 campaign as Kilmarnock posted ninth-place finishes in the Scottish Premier League.

On 20 February 2014, McKeown joined Scottish Championship side Cowdenbeath on a one-month emergency loan. He made his debut for the "Miners" two days later and scored 33 minutes into a 2–0 win over Dundee at Central Park. Having made six appearances and scoring once, his loan spell with Cowdenbeath was extended until the end of the 2013–14 season. He featured a total of 16 times for Jimmy Nicholl's "Blue Brazil", scoring two goals, as Cowdenbeath finished in ninth-place but avoided relegation with a 4–1 victory over Dunfermline Athletic in the play-off final. He was released by Kilmarnock manager Allan Johnston upon his return to Rugby Park.

Raith Rovers
On 23 June 2014, McKeown joined Scottish Championship side Raith Rovers. He was an ever-present throughout the 2014–15 season, helping Grant Murray's Rovers to a sixth-place finish. He was also a near ever-present under new manager Ray McKinnon for the 2015–16 season, missing just one Scottish Challenge Cup game. Rovers secured a play-off place with a fourth-place finish, but were eliminated at the quarter-final stage following a 2–1 aggregate defeat to Hibernian.

Accrington Stanley
On 30 August 2016, McKeown joined EFL League Two side Accrington Stanley on non-contract terms. He played in that evening's EFL Trophy fixture with Crewe Alexandra at the Crown Ground, which ended in a 3–0 defeat. He was not picked again by manager John Coleman and left shortly afterwards. He had a trial at Polish Ekstraklasa side Górnik Zabrze the following month.

Non-league
McKeown joined Northern Premier League Premier Division club Warrington Town in November 2016. On 31 December 2016, he joined National League relegation strugglers Southport. He scored three goals in 19 appearances for Andy Preece's side, who ended the 2016–17 campaign in the relegation places, and he departed Haig Avenue in the summer.

On 7 August 2017, he re-signed with Warrington Town. Manager Paul Carden said that "Rory has had opportunities to go in at clubs higher up, but things haven't materialised for him. He's got quality and now he just needs to get his head down. Chances will come to him if he's performing well, everyone is getting watched all the time." He was an ever-present throughout the 2017–18 season to help the "Yellows" to qualify for the play-offs with a third-place finish, scoring the winning goal over Shaw Lane on the final day of the season, but was suspended for the play-off semi-final defeat to Grantham Town after being sent off in the game against Shaw Lane for an "innocuous-looking challenge".

He joined Port Vale on trial in July 2018. Manager Neil Aspin said that "he gave a good account of himself" but decided to strengthen in other positions instead.

Greenock Morton
McKeown joined back up with former manager at Raith, Ray McKinnon, at Greenock Morton in August 2018. He left Morton in June 2019.

Team Wellington
On 19 August 2019 Team Wellington in New Zealand announced the signing of McKeown.

Crusaders
After leaving Team Wellington McKeown came home to Northern Ireland and signed for NIFL Premiership side Crusaders on the 3rd July 2022 prior to a 5-0 friendly victory against Comber Recreation.

International career
McKeown won caps for Northern Ireland at under-16, under-17, under-18, under-19 and  under-21 level. He was called up to the senior team by Michael O'Neill in September 2013, and sat on the bench as an unused substitute for the 2014 FIFA World Cup qualifiers with Portugal and Luxembourg.

Style of play
McKeown is a versatile player, able to play at as a left-sided full-back, wing-back or winger. He has been described as an "athletic modern day left-back", with the extra attributes of pace and a good long-throw.

Career statistics

References

1993 births
Association football fullbacks
Association football wingers
Association footballers from Northern Ireland
Living people
Accrington Stanley F.C. players
Cowdenbeath F.C. players
Greenock Morton F.C. players
Ipswich Town F.C. players
Kilmarnock F.C. players
Raith Rovers F.C. players
Southport F.C. players
Warrington Town F.C. players
Team Wellington players
National League (English football) players
Northern Ireland youth international footballers
Northern Premier League players
Scottish Premier League players
Scottish Professional Football League players
New Zealand Football Championship players
Association footballers from Belfast
Expatriate footballers in England
Expatriate association footballers in New Zealand
Crusaders F.C. players